Kottarakkara is a town in Kollam district.

Kottarakkara may also refer to:

Bobby Kottarakkara
 Kottarakkara (actor), Indian actor

See also